Xiao Yan (born 6 March 1997) is a Chinese actress.

Career
In 2015, Xiao Yan made her acting debut in the television series A Detective Housewife.

In 2016, Xiao played her first leading role in the web film Princess & Her 49 Servants.

In 2017, Xiao gained recognition for her performance in the youth campus drama Hot Blooded Goddess. She then starred in the wuxia drama The Lost Swordship, and sang the theme song of the drama titled "Gaze".

In 2019, Xiao became known to the broad audience after her roles as Qin Zhiyan in the xianxia drama The Legends, and as Green Snake (Xiao Qing) in the web series adaptation of the folktale legend The Legend of White Snake. The same year, she featured in fantasy drama L.O.R.D. Critical World. 

In 2020, Xiao starred in the period detective drama My Roommate is a Detective alongside Hu Yitian and Zhang Yunlong, playing a newspaper reporter. The same year, she starred in the Chinese remake of the Singapore period drama The Little Nyonya, playing dual roles as the female lead and the female lead's mother. Xiao also starred in historical romance web drama Marry Me alongside Xing Zhaolin; and featured in romance drama Love is Sweet.

Filmography

Film

Television series

Discography

Awards and nominations

References

1997 births
Living people
21st-century Chinese actresses
Civil Aviation Flight University of China alumni
Chinese television actresses